William Hannum Grubb Bullard (6 December 1866 – 24 November 1927) was an admiral of the United States Navy, whose service included duty during the Spanish–American War and World War I. After World War I, he established the Navy's patrol on China's Yangtze River.  A noted electrical engineer, he wrote a popular handbook on naval electrical systems, and contributed to the use of radio in the Navy.

Early life and education
William Bullard was born in Media, Pennsylvania on December 6, 1866. His father was Orson Flagg Bullard, a member of the Pennsylvania legislature. William graduated from Media High School in 1882, as a member of the school's first graduating class. He attended the United States Naval Academy, graduating in 1886. He returned to the Naval Academy in the mid-1890s, where he participated on the officers' summer baseball team.

Overseas duty

He served in  during the Spanish–American War and commanded the battleship , serving with the British Grand Fleet, during World War I.

On August 5, 1921, the Yangtze Patrol force was organized under Rear Admiral Bullard as part of the Asiatic Fleet. During the unsettled conditions in China during the 1920s and 1930s, the Navy patrolled the Yangtze to protect United States interests, lives, and property.

Contributions to electrical engineering
Bullard gained a reputation as an authority on electrical systems and radio communications. In 1904, while still a junior officer, the then-lieutenant published through the United States Naval Institute a work titled Naval Electricians' Text and Handbook. Later retitled the Naval Electricians' Text Book, the work went through multiple editions, being re-released in 1908, 1911, 1915, and 1917.

On 13 December 1912, Captain Bullard was appointed Superintendent of the Naval Radio Service, within the Bureau of Navigation. During his tenure, he developed a Handbook of Regulations (1913).

After World War I, Bullard served in 1919 as a member of the Inter-Allied Conference on Radio, and later served as Director of Naval Communications, Navy Department. In 1927, he was appointed as chairman of the newly created Federal Radio Commission but died shortly into his tenure.

Retirement and legacy
Rear Admiral Bullard retired in 1922 and died in Washington, D.C., 24 November 1927.

Namesakes
Two ships have been named in Bullard's honor.  In 1943, the Navy named the destroyer USS Bullard (DD-660) after him. In February 1946, construction was completed on the cable-laying vessel SS William H. G. Bullard (M. C. hull 2557), built for the U.S. Maritime Commission by Pusey and Jones Corporation of Wilmington, Del. The vessel was acquired by the Navy in 1953 and redesignated USS Neptune (ARC-2).

References

 Some of Bullard's works on electrical engineering and radio can be found in the collections of the Library of Congress.
 Bullard, William Hannum Grubb, 1866–1927
 Bullard, William Hannum Grubb (from old catalog)
 Yangtze River Patrol and Other US Navy Asiatic Fleet Activities in China, 1920–1942, as Described in the Annual Reports of the Navy Department – from the Naval Historical Center
 Howeth, Linwood S., History of Communications-Electronics in the United States Navy. Washington: Bureau of Ships and Office of Naval History, 1963.

External links
 DANFS: USS Neptune (ARC-2) – from the Naval Historical Center
 Photo of Bullard as a member of the officers' summer baseball team, 1895, United States Naval Academy, Photo #: NH 53161 – from the Naval Historical Center
 Media High School: The First Graduates: The Class of 1882

1866 births
1927 deaths
United States Navy rear admirals
People from Media, Pennsylvania
United States Naval Academy alumni
American military personnel of the Spanish–American War
United States Navy personnel of World War I
American electrical engineers
Members of the Federal Radio Commission
Engineers from Pennsylvania
Military personnel from Pennsylvania